Ursa Major is a public art work by artist William Underhill located at the Lynden Sculpture Garden near Milwaukee, Wisconsin. The trapezoidal abstract sculpture is made of Cor-Ten steel; it is installed on the lawn.

References

External links
 Bill Underhill Gallery

1966 sculptures
Outdoor sculptures in Milwaukee
Steel sculptures in Wisconsin
Abstract sculptures in Wisconsin
1966 establishments in Wisconsin